Dine Abduramanov, known as Dine Abduramana, was a Bulgarian revolutionary, a worker of the Internal Macedonian-Adrianople Revolutionary Organization (IMARO).

Dine Abduramanov was born in the village of Patele, Ottoman Empire, today Agios Panteleimonas, Florina regional unit, Greece. He first entered the IMARO in 1896. He was a close friend of Marko Lerinski and a member of his revolutionary band. In June 1902 Marko Lerinski entered the village of Patele in order to punish the traitors of the organization. The band was betrayed and surrounded by Turkish military. The leader Marko died in the battle while all other freedom fighters managed to escape. Dine Abduramanov refused to escape with his friends, barricaded himself in his own house and continued the battle with the Turkish military alone for a period of six hours. The Turks used his wife, daughter, sister and uncle, but Dine refused to surrender and he killed his relatives firing against the siege. When he got shortages of ammunition, he went against the Turks with his yataghan and died. According to the historian and biographer Hristo Silyanov, who was also a revolutionary of IMARO:

References
 Енциклопедия „България“, том 1, Издателство на БАН, София, 1978.

Notes

1870s births
1902 deaths

Year of birth uncertain
People from Amyntaio
Macedonian Bulgarians
Members of the Internal Macedonian Revolutionary Organization
Bulgarians from Aegean Macedonia
Bulgarian revolutionaries